The This Is A Fix album tour was the 2008 tour surrounding the release of Welsh band The Automatic's second album This Is A Fix. The first leg of the tour was played at smaller clubs and venues around the United Kingdom, whilst later dates were at some of the countries larger venues.

Background
The band's first tour with new guitarist Paul Mullen involved touring some of the smaller less-known venues and clubs of the United Kingdom. The tour involved the band playing a 50/50 split of old and new material. Many of the songs played on the first album were chosen by the band's fans who set up a poll on their forum. By the time the band began touring "By My Side", "Recover" and "That's What She Said" were all favoured by fans, many of the b-sides were also requested. During performances, synthesizer and keyboard duties would be split between Frost and Mullen. The performances at The Blake Theatre in Monmouth on 28 March, Central Station in Wrexham on 29 March, The Galleri in Caernarfon on 30 March, Brycheiniog Theatre in Brecon 31 March 2008 were all rescheduled after the band required further time to rehearse their new and old songs. On 17 April 2008, NME announced the band would be playing "One of their first shows without keyboardist Alex Pennie". The band performed at the UK release show for the video game Rock Band, the gig was held in a secret location in London. The band headlined the Rock Against Racism Left Field stage with Frank Turner, Kate Nash, Dirty Pretty Things, British Sea Power among other bands performing on the stage over the weekend. The band had to pull out of the small festival after T4 on the Beach rehearsal took place on this date, the band apologised on their website saying; "Due to promotional demands we've had to pull out of the Midsommer Norton show on 19 July. We're really sorry to everyone with tickets who was looking forward to the show but we'll be out on tour again soon". Having a strong love for Irish trio Ash, one of The Automatic's main influences have also, and during earlier days of the band's career they would cover Ash single "Kung Fu" from the album 1977, in June 2007 The Automatic were invited for drinks after their show together at Hull University Summer Ball, later in 2008 at Cardiff Big Weekend Ash dedicated the track "Oh Yeah" to the band, who had played earlier that day. Photographer Peter Hill performed bass guitar for the first time with the band during the band's performance of "This Is A Fix" which sees singer Rob play synth instead of bass. Originally the tour was scheduled to take place in from 14 June 2008 to 24 June 2008 however due to the recording of the album This Is A Fix it was pushed back to September.

Setlist
For the club tour the band asked fans to vote for tracks that they wanted to hear from previous album Not Accepted Anywhere, ultimately "That's What She Said", "By My Side", "Lost at Home", "Recover", "Raoul", "On The Campaign Trail" and "Monster" made the setlist for various legs of the tour.
Club tour
 Light Entertainment
 Recover
 Steve McQueen
 Monster
 Secret Police
 Magazines
 By My Side
 This Ship
 Lost at Home
 Sleepwalking/Bad Guy/Make The Mistakes/Accessories/In The Mountains/Responsible Citizen
 That's What She Said
 This Is A Fix
 Raoul
Album tour
 Raoul
 On The Campaign Trail
 Responsible Citizen/Accessories
 In The Mountains
 Monster
 Magazines
 This Ship
 Lost at Home
 This Is A Fix
 Secret Police/That's What She Said
 Recover
 By My Side/Something Else
 Light Entertainment
 Love in This Club
 Steve McQueen

Tour dates

References 

The Automatic
2008 concert tours